Jürgen Nelis (born 21 October 1964) is a Dutch rower. He competed in the men's quadruple sculls event at the 1988 Summer Olympics.

References

1964 births
Living people
Dutch male rowers
Olympic rowers of the Netherlands
Rowers at the 1988 Summer Olympics
Sportspeople from Eindhoven